Kim Michael Last (born 20 January 1997) is a British actor and dancer. He is known as the youngest member of the all-male dance group That's My Bae on the noontime variety show Eat Bulaga!

Early life 

Kim Last was born in Kings Cross, London to a British father and a Kapampangan mother from Angeles City, Pampanga. He immigrated to the Philippines when he was 17 years old. He studied Government and Politics and A-Level Biology at Chelsea Academy in London before joining the competition.

Career 

Last first appeared in 2015 as a contestant of the That's My Bae: "Twerk It" Dance Contest segment of the noontime variety show Eat Bulaga!, and became a member of the dance group That's My Bae.

In 2016, he became a regular cast member of the comedy-variety show Sunday PinaSaya. Also in this year, he get the biggest acting break with his group by the morning series Trops.

Filmography

Television

Movies

Accolades

See also 
 Jon Timmons
 Kenneth Medrano
 Miggy Tolentino

References

External links 
 

1997 births
Living people
Filipino male television actors
British male television actors
People from Kings Cross, London
Dancers from London
GMA Network personalities
TV5 (Philippine TV network) personalities